Berezove is a village in Starobilsk Raion (district) in Luhansk Oblast of eastern Ukraine.

Demographics
Native language as of the Ukrainian Census of 2001:
Ukrainian 95.00%
Russian 5.00%

References

External links
 Weather forecast for Berezove
Starobilsk Raion

Villages in Staroblisk Raion